Wrestling at the 1999 Military World Games was held at the Peščenica Sports Hall in Zagreb, Croatia from 13 to 16 August 1999.

Medal summary

Men's freestyle

Men's Greco-Roman

Medal table

References

2nd Military World Games 1999 Results

External links
UWW Database

Wrestling
1999
Military World Games